Ndali, or Chindali, is a Bantu language spoken by an increasing population in southern Tanzania of 150,000 (1987) and in northern Malawi by 70,000 (2003).

Sukwa, or Chisukwa, spoken in the Misuku Hills of northern Malawi, is closely related to Ndali, and both languages are fairly close to Lambya.

The examples below come in the order Lambya, Ndali, Sukwa, showing the similarity of vocabulary:

Further reading
 Botne, R. (2008). Grammatical Sketch of Chindali: Malawian Variety. Darby: Diane.
 Botne, R. and Schaffer, L. (2008). A Chindali and English Dictionary with an Index to ProtoBantu Roots: The Chindali Language of Malawi. Vol 1. Philadelphia: American Philosophical Society. 
 Kershner, Tiffany (2001). "Imperfectivity in Chisukwa" in Explorations in African Linguistics: From Lamso to Sesotho, eds. Robert Botne and Rose Vondrasek, Bloomington: Indiana University Working Papers in Linguistics,  pp. 37–52.
 Mtenje, Atikonda (2016). A comparative analysis of the Phonology and Morpho-syntax of Cisukwa, Cindali and Cilambya. (University of Cape Town PhD thesis)
 Swilla, Imani N. (1998). Tenses in Chindali. Afrikanistische Arbeitspapiere (AAP) 54. 95–125.

References

External links

Language Mapping Survey for Northern Malawi. University of Malawi Centre for Language Studies, 2006. Contains comparative vocabulary and a short text (the Tortoise and the Hare) in Chindali and other languages.
Language Map of Northern Malawi
Paper by Martin Walsh and Imani Swilla on South-West Tanzanian languages (2002)

Languages of Malawi
Rukwa languages
Languages of Tanzania